Megalomyrmex is a genus of ant in the subfamily Myrmicinae. The genus is known only from the Neotropics, where some of the species are specialized parasites or predators of Attini.

Description
It is difficult to characterize morphologically. Bolton (2003) placed it in the tribe Solenopsidini, but with multiple exceptions to the diagnostic characters for the tribe. The tribal characters include a bicarinate clypeus and a median clypeal seta. Most Megalomyrmex species have a smoothly convex clypeus with no trace of the bicarinate condition, and most have abundant clypeal setae with no distinct or differentiated median seta. In Bolton's (1994) key to genera, Megalomyrmex keys in multiple places because of variability in mandibular dentition. Nevertheless, the genus has a distinctive habitus: the antenna is 12-segmented with a 3-segmented club; the general integument is smooth and shiny without coarse sculpture or dull areas; the promesonotum is evenly arched, without promesonotal groove; the propodeum is usually smoothly curved between dorsal and posterior faces, at most with blunt, broad-based tubercles, and never with spines; and the hind tibial spur is simple. In short, the workers look like a Solenopsis with Pheidole antennae. The mandibular dentition varies from a simple set of 5 similar teeth on the masticatory margin, gradually diminishing in size basally, to a condition with 2 large apical teeth followed by up to 12 small denticles.

Some species have unusual alkaloids. The hypothesis that alkaloids act at a distance converges with what is known for the genera Solenopsis, Monomorium and Megalomyrmex when workers release volatile venom alkaloids by waving their stingers (i.e., gaster flagging) during interspecific encounters causing their enemies to flee.

It is close to Monomorium and should possibly be included in the latter.

Distribution and habitat
Although widespread in the Neotropics, from southern Mexico to northern Argentina, Megalomyrmex species are never abundant. They occur in low to middle elevation wet to dry forest habitats. Some species are free-living with large diffuse nests in the soil (e.g. Megalomyrmex modestus) or small nests in dead wood (e.g. Megalomyrmex drifti). Others are specialized social parasites or predators of Attini (e.g. Megalomyrmex adamsae, Megalomyrmex mondabora, Megalomyrmex symmetochus, Megalomyrmex wettereri).

Species

Megalomyrmex acauna Brandão, 1990
Megalomyrmex adamsae Longino, 2010
Megalomyrmex ayri Brandão, 1990
Megalomyrmex balzani Emery, 1894
Megalomyrmex bidentatus Fernández & Baena, 1997
Megalomyrmex bituberculatus (Fabricius, 1798)
Megalomyrmex brandaoi Boudinot, Sumnicht & Adams, 2013
Megalomyrmex caete Brandão, 1990
Megalomyrmex cuatiara Brandão, 1990
Megalomyrmex cupecuara Brandão, 1990
Megalomyrmex cyendyra Brandão, 1990
Megalomyrmex drifti Kempf, 1961
Megalomyrmex emeryi Forel, 1904
Megalomyrmex foreli Emery, 1890
Megalomyrmex fungiraptor Boudinot, Sumnicht & Adams, 2013
Megalomyrmex glaesarius Kempf, 1970
Megalomyrmex gnomus Kempf, 1970
Megalomyrmex goeldii Forel, 1912
Megalomyrmex iheringi Forel, 1911
Megalomyrmex incisus Smith, 1947
Megalomyrmex leoninus Forel, 1885
Megalomyrmex longinoi Boudinot, Sumnicht & Adams, 2013
Megalomyrmex megadrifti Boudinot, Sumnicht & Adams, 2013
Megalomyrmex milenae Boudinot, Sumnicht & Adams, 2013
Megalomyrmex miri Brandão, 1990
Megalomyrmex modestus Emery, 1896
Megalomyrmex mondabora Brandão, 1990
Megalomyrmex mondaboroides Longino, 2010
Megalomyrmex myops Santschi, 1925
Megalomyrmex nocarina Longino, 2010
Megalomyrmex osadrifti Boudinot, Sumnicht & Adams, 2013
Megalomyrmex pacova Brandão, 1990
Megalomyrmex piriana Brandão, 1990
Megalomyrmex poatan Brandão, 1990
Megalomyrmex pusillus Forel, 1912
Megalomyrmex reina Longino, 2010
Megalomyrmex silvestrii Wheeler, 1909
Megalomyrmex staudingeri Emery, 1890
Megalomyrmex symmetochus Wheeler, 1925
Megalomyrmex tasyba Brandão, 1990
Megalomyrmex timbira Brandão, 1990
Megalomyrmex wallacei Mann, 1916
Megalomyrmex wettereri Brandão, 2003
Megalomyrmex weyrauchi Kempf, 1970

References

Bolton, B. (1994) Identification Guide to the Ant Genera of the World. Harvard University Press, Cambridge, MA, London, 222 pp.
Bolton, B. (2003) Synopsis and classification of Formicidae. Memoirs of the American Entomological Institute 71: 1–370

External links

Myrmicinae
Ant genera
Taxonomy articles created by Polbot